The 2007 WNBA season was the ninth season for the Minnesota Lynx. The Lynx tied their franchise-worst record from 2006 and never reached the playoff race.

Offseason

Dispersal Draft

WNBA Draft

Regular season

Season standings

Season schedule

 * The July 6 game was played at Williams Arena due to a conflict at Target Center.

Player stats

References

Minnesota Lynx seasons
Minnesota
Minnesota Lynx